Phemba, also known as Yombe maternity figures, refers to sculptural objects that depict the figures of a mother and child. 
Phemba are iconic examples of Kongo art and according to Thompson (1981) "reflect the degree to which women are treasured in Kongo culture, not just for their fecundity, but as seers and guardians of the spirit". 
Kongo societies are matrilineal.

In special cases, communities honored women by commissioning stone icons depicting a mother and child to be placed on their tombs. This was also considered dangerous, as it represented an insertion of the source of life - the mother - into the world of the dead.

The Kikongo word phemba translates to "the white", in reference to the white earth (Kaolinite) that is a sign of fertility in the region. The name is interpreted by  John M. Janzen (1979) as denoting "'the one who gives children in-potentia.' A phemba child is a magically conceived nkisi child, a fragile emissary of the spirit world."

Phemba statuary falls into two groups: mothers cradling or holding their babies, and mothers nursing.
The very different styles of phemba sculptures illustrate regional and even personal variations on the same theme.
Oral tradition holds that the phemba cult was established by a famous midwife.

See also 
Nkisi
Nkondi

References 

Kongo culture
Kingdom of Kongo
African art
African society
Traditional African medicine
Sculptures of women